Jieh Wu is an engineer at the National Chiao-Tung University in Hsinchu City, Taiwan. He was named a Fellow of the Institute of Electrical and Electronics Engineers (IEEE) in 2016 for his contributions to the design and calibration of high-performance data converters.

References 

Fellow Members of the IEEE
Living people
Academic staff of the National Chiao Tung University
Taiwanese engineers
Year of birth missing (living people)